The Manchu bow is a type of composite recurve bow historically used in Manchuria, and subsequently spread to China, Mongolia, and Tibet during the Qing dynasty. It is similar in construction and likely shares roots with the medieval Mongol bow. It is characterized by very large siyahs, long draw length, prominent string bridges, and use with typically large and heavy arrows. Due to its extensive usage outside Manchuria, this bow is also often identified as a Chinese bow or Mongol bow, and during the 17th century, its widespread usage (along with the increasing proliferation of firearms) almost completely displaced all other types of bows in the Qing Empire.

The Manchu bow was traditionally thumb drawn using a cylindrical thumb ring.

The early inhabitants of Manchuria likely used other types of bow as well, and may have used a type of mulberry longbow for hunting in wet weather conditions which could negatively affect the glues used for composite bow construction. 

Imperial bow is manchu heavy bow, a variation of manchu bow that is much stiffer and larger and has a heavy draw weight - aka war bow. 

Bows (archery)
Chinese inventions
History of Manchuria
Military history of the Qing dynasty
Weapons of China
Archery in China